Witold Plutecki (born 8 October 1956) is a Polish former cyclist. He competed in the team time trial event at the 1980 Summer Olympics.

References

External links
 

1956 births
Living people
Polish male cyclists
Olympic cyclists of Poland
Cyclists at the 1980 Summer Olympics
Sportspeople from Gliwice